Let It Flow is a solo album by Dave Mason, released in 1977. Let It Flow was Mason’s biggest selling album while on Columbia Records. Mason was joined on the album by a variety of guest musicians. The album reached #37 on the Billboard 200, lasting 49 weeks on the chart. The song "We Just Disagree" reached number #12 on the Billboard charts in the US and was the record's major commercial success. Other charting singles from this album are "So High (Rock Me Baby and Roll Me Away)" and "Let It Go, Let It Flow", which reached #89 and #45 in the US respectively.

Track listing

Personnel 
 Dave Mason – guitar, vocals
 Jim Krueger – guitar, rhythm guitar, vocals
 Gerald Johnson – bass
 Mike Finnigan – keyboards, vocals
 Bobbye Hall – percussion
 Rick Jaeger – drums
 Karen Patterson – vocals
 Verna Richardson – vocals
 Yvonne Elliman - vocals on Seasons 
 Stephen Stills – vocals
 Ernie Watts – saxophone

Production
Dave Mason, Ron Nevison - producer
Michael Beiriger, Rick Smith - engineer
Mike Reese - mastering
Mick Haggerty, Tom Steele - photography/design

References

Dave Mason albums
1977 albums
Columbia Records albums
Albums produced by Dave Mason
Albums produced by Ron Nevison
Albums recorded at Record Plant (Los Angeles)